Roberto Núñez Mañas (born 3 January 1996), simply known as Roberto, is a Spanish professional footballer who plays for Águilas FC as a forward.

Club career
Born in Talavera de la Reina, Toledo, Castile-La Mancha, Roberto joined Atlético Madrid's youth setup in 2006, aged ten. He made his senior debut with the reserves on 11 May 2014, coming on as a second half substitute for Xu Xin in a 1–2 away loss against Barakaldo CF in the Segunda División B.

In the 2014 summer, Roberto was definitely promoted to the C-team in Tercera División. The following year, after the reserves' relegation, he upgraded to the B-side.

Roberto made his first team debut on 30 November 2016, replacing fellow debutant Caio Henrique and scoring the last in a 6–0 away routing of CD Guijuelo, in the season's Copa del Rey. 
In a test match against Sevilla FC Roberto was employed as a defender. After this rather unsuccessful experiment he performed as a forward again. 
The following 31 August, he moved abroad after agreeing to a contract with Belgian side Royal Antwerp FC.

On 10 July 2018, after featuring in only two cup matches, Roberto returned to Spain and its third division after agreeing to a deal with UD Las Palmas Atlético. On 20 November 2020, he signed for Águilas FC in the fourth tier.

References

External links

1996 births
Living people
People from Talavera de la Reina
Sportspeople from the Province of Toledo
Spanish footballers
Footballers from Castilla–La Mancha
Association football forwards
Segunda División B players
Tercera División players
Atlético Madrid B players
Atlético Madrid footballers
UD Las Palmas Atlético players
Royal Antwerp F.C. players
Spain youth international footballers
Spanish expatriate footballers
Spanish expatriate sportspeople in Belgium
Expatriate footballers in Belgium
Águilas FC players